Events from the year 1436 in France

Incumbents
 Monarch – Charles VII

Events
 April - Paris is recaptured from the English by French forces during the Hundred Years War
 25 June - Scottish princess Margaret Stewart marries the future Louis XI in Tours
 29 July - French forces abandon their Siege of Calais

References

1430s in France